Philippe Gallas (born 7 April 1959) is a French former professional footballer who played as a defender. He made thirty-two league appearances for Nîmes from 1979 to 1982.

References 

1959 births
Living people
People from Cavaillon
Sportspeople from Vaucluse
French footballers
Association football defenders
INF Vichy players
Nîmes Olympique players

French Division 3 (1971–1993) players
Ligue 1 players
Ligue 2 players
Footballers from Provence-Alpes-Côte d'Azur